Dallas College Brookhaven Campus (Brookhaven or BHC) is a public community college in Farmers Branch, Texas. It is one of seven campuses of Dallas College, and it opened in 1978, making it the newest campus in Dallas College (excluding satellite campuses).

Serving northwest Dallas County, Dallas College Brookhaven Campus provides freshman- and sophomore-level academic credit courses, which may be applied toward an associate degree or transferred to a four-year college or university. The Core Curriculum is guaranteed to transfer to public universities in Texas.  Career and technical education programs help prepare students for immediate entrance into the workforce. Along with traditional transfer class offerings, Brookhaven College's technical program offerings include accounting, automotive technology, business administration, child development, computer information systems, e-commerce, emergency medical services, geospatial technology, international business and trade, management, marketing, nursing, office technology, paramedicine, radiologic technology and visual communications.

Continuing education classes offer personal or professional development in a variety of subjects including art, business, computers, health care careers, education, English for Speakers of Other Languages, music, nonprofit management, real estate and more.  Corporate training also is available.

Campus
These buildings include the  Brookhaven College Geotechnology Institute, one of three similar facilities nationwide to offer continuing professional development to professionals in the oil and gas industries, and the Brookhaven College School of the Arts (BCSA) expanded facility, with a  gallery, a renovated ceramics/kiln yard, Macintosh computer lab and a 680-seat performance hall.

The Dallas Weekend College (DWEC) of Our Lady of the Lake University moved to Brookhaven in 1997.

Special programs
Programs of study added in recent years include associate degree programs in Mexican-American Studies (Fall, 2006), geographic information systems (Fall, 2005) and Criminal Justice (Fall, 2009).

In 2006, Dallas College Brookhaven Campus began a partnership with the Carrollton-Farmers Branch Independent School District to offer an Early College High School program, which admits a limited number of ninth-grade students to an on-site high school program that allows them to begin their college studies during their eleventh-grade year and earn an associate degree along with their high school diplomas. This program is in addition to the existing dual-credit program that allows select secondary-school students to enroll in college courses at low cost while continuing at their original high-school campuses.

The college also hosts a Head Start Center, which provides child care services for low-income families. The Center also serves as a learning tool for students in the Child Development program.

The Students 55+ program offers non-credit, enrichment courses for adults 55 and older.

Tuition
Dallas County residents pay $79 per credit hour, or $237 for a three-hour class. Out-of-county residents pay $137 per credit hour. Out of state and international students are charged $200 per credit unit or a minimum of $200.

Tuition Waiver for Senior Adults

Senior adults, those 65 and older, who live in or own property in Dallas County, can enroll in up to six hours of credit courses each semester or summer session at no cost, based on availability.

Notable alumni
 Derek Campos – Mixed Martial Artist signed with Bellator MMA
 Takudzwa Ngwenya – Professional rugby player for the United States national rugby union team
 Jad Saxton – voice actress affiliated with Funimation and Sentai Filmworks

References

External links
Official website

Universities and colleges in the Dallas–Fort Worth metroplex
Educational institutions established in 1978
Dallas College
Buildings and structures in Dallas County, Texas
1978 establishments in Texas
Universities and colleges accredited by the Southern Association of Colleges and Schools
NJCAA athletics
Two-year colleges in Texas